The Tokyo bitterling (Tanakia tanago) is a temperate freshwater fish of the carp family (Cyprinidae). Taxonomically, it belongs to the subfamily Acheilognathinae.

The species was first described as Rhodeus tanago by Shigeho Tanaka in 1909. It is widely known as Tanakia tanago, although a 2014 study suggests it is genetically distinct from other Tanakia species, and warrants placement it the monotypic genus Pseudorhodeus.

Distribution
In the wild, this fish is found only on the Kantō Plain of Japan, an area near the capital city, Tokyo. The fish was formerly abundant in small streams, but its habitat has been overrun by people and pollution.

Threats
There is a real risk that it could become extinct in the wild. It also suffers from competition from the related but more aggressive rosy bitterling. Bitterlings lay their eggs in freshwater mussel shells. The Tokyo bitterling lays its eggs in only one type of mussel shell, limiting its chances of successful breeding. To help protect the fish, it has been declared a "national monument" by the Japanese government, and this gives it special protection.

References

Tanakia
Natural monuments of Japan
Freshwater fish of Japan
Endemic fauna of Japan
Fish described in 1909
Taxa named by Shigeho Tanaka